The 1994 Saskatchewan Roughriders finished in 4th place in the West Division with an 11–7 record and qualified for the playoffs, but lost the West Semi-Final game to the Calgary Stampeders.

Offseason

CFL draft

Preseason

Regular season

Season Standings

Season schedule

Postseason

Schedule

References

Saskatchewan Roughriders seasons
1994 Canadian Football League season by team
1994 in Saskatchewan